The supratrochlear artery (or frontal artery) is one of the terminal branches of the ophthalmic artery. It arises within the orbit. It exits the orbit alongside the supratrochlear nerve. It contributes arterial supply to the skin, muscles and pericranium of the forehead.

Anatomy
It branches from the ophthalmic artery near the trochlea of the superior oblique muscle in the orbit.

Origin 
The supratrochlear artery branches from the ophthalmic artery in the orbit near the trochlea of the superior oblique muscle.

Course 
After branching from the ophthalmic artery, it passes anteriorly through the superomedial orbit. It travels medial to the trochlear nerve. With the supratrochlear nerve, the supratrochlear artery exits the orbit through the supratrochlear notch (variably present), medial to the supraorbital foramen. It then ascends on the forehead.

Anastomoses 
The supratrochlear artery anastomoses with the contralateral supratrochlear artery, and the ipsilateral supraorbital artery.

Distribution 
The supratrochlear artery supplies blood to the skin of the medial aspect of the forehead and scalp, as well as the underlying pericranium and frontalis muscle.

References

External links 
https://radiopaedia.org/articles/supratrochlear-artery

Arteries of the head and neck